Gamma-aminobutyric acid receptor subunit alpha-3 is a protein that in humans is encoded by the GABRA3 gene.

Function 

GABA is the major inhibitory neurotransmitter in the mammalian brain where it acts at GABAA receptors, which are ligand-gated chloride channels. Chloride conductance of these channels can be modulated by agents such as benzodiazepines that bind to the GABAA receptor. At least 16 distinct subunits of GABA-A receptors have been identified. GABA receptors are composed of 5 subunits with an extracellular ligand binding domains and ion channel domains that are integral to the membrane. Ligand binding to these receptors activates the channel.

Subunit selective ligands 

Recent research has produced several ligands that are selective for GABAA receptors containing the α3 subunit. Subtype-selective agonists for α3 produce anxiolytic effects without sedative, amnesia, or ataxia. selective a3 agonists also show lack of dependence,  and could make them superior to currently marketed drugs.

Agonists 
 Adipiplon
 PWZ-029 (partial agonist at α3, partial inverse agonist at α5)
 TP003 (Selective full agonist at α3)

Inverse agonists 
 α3IA

RNA editing 

The GABRA3 transcript undergoes pre-mRNA editing by the ADAR family of enzymes. A-to-I editing changes an isoleucine codon to code for a methionine residue. This editing is thought to be important for brain development, as the level of editing is low at birth and becomes almost 100% in an adult brain.

The editing occurs in an RNA stem-loop found in exon 9. The structured loci was identified using a specialised bioinformatics screen of the human genome. The proposed function of the edit is to alter chloride permeability of the GABA receptor.

At the time of discovery, Kv1.1 mRNA was the only previously known mammalian coding site containing both the edit sequence and the editing complementary sequence.

Type 

A to I RNA editing is catalyzed by a family of adenosine deaminases acting on RNA (ADARs) that specifically recognize adenosines within double-stranded regions of pre-mRNAs and deaminate  them to inosine. Inosines are recognised as guanosine by the cells translational machinery. There are three members of the ADAR family ADARs 1–3, with ADAR1 and ADAR2 being the only enzymatically active members. ADAR3 is thought to have a regulatory role in the brain.  ADAR1 and ADAR 2 are widely expressed in tissues, while ADAR3 is restricted to the brain. The double-stranded regions of RNA are formed  by base-pairing between residues in the close to region of the editing site, with residues usually in a neighboring intron but can be an exonic sequence. The region that base pairs with the editing region is known as an Editing Complementary Sequence (ECS).

Location 

The editing site was previously believed to be a single nucleotide polymorphism. The editing site is found at amino acid 5 of transmembrane domain 3 of exon 9. The predicted double-stranded RNA structure is interrupted by three bulges and a mismatch at the editing site.  The double-stranded region is 22 base pairs in length. As with editing of the KCNA1 gene product, the editing region and the editing complementary sequence are both found in exonic regions. In the pre=mRNA of GABRA3, both are found within exon 9. The other subunits of the receptor are thought not to be edited, as their predicted secondary structure is less likely to be edited. Also, alpha subunits 1 and 6 have a uridine instead of an adenosine at the site corresponding to the editing site in alpha subunit 3. Point mutation experiments determined that a Cytidine 15 nucleotides from the editing site is the base opposite the edited base. Using a GABRA3 mini-gene that encodes for exon 9 cotransfected to HEK293 cells with either ADAR1 or -2 or none, it was determined that both active ADARs can efficiently edited the site in exon 9.

Regulation 

The mRNA expression of the alpha 3 subunit is developmentally regulated.  It is the dominant subunit in the forebrain tissue at birth, gradually decreasing in prominence as alpha subunit 1 takes over. Also experiments with mice have demonstrated that editing of pre-mRNA alpha 3 subunit increases from 50% at birth to nearly 100% in adult. Editing levels are lower in the hippocampus

Conservation 

At the location corresponding to the I/M site of GABRA3 in frog and pufferfish there is a genomically encoded methionine.  In all other species, there is an isoleucine at the position.

Consequences

Structure 

Editing results in a codon change from (AUA) I to (AUG) M at the editing site.  This results in translation of a methionine instead of an isoleucine at the I/M site.  The amino acid change occurs in the transmembrane domain 3. The 4 transmembrane domains of each of the 5 subunits that make up the receptor interact to form the receptor channel.  It is likely that the change of amino acids disturbs the structure, effecting gating and inactivation of the channel. This is because methionine has a larger side chain.

Function 

While the effect of editing on protein function is unknown, the developmental increase in editing does correspond to changes in function of the GABAA receptor. GABA binding leads to chloride channel activation, resulting in rapid increase in concentration of the ion. Initially, the receptor is an excitatory receptor, mediating depolarisation (efflux of Cl− ions) in immature neurons before changing to an inhibitory receptor, mediating hyperpolarisation (influx of Cl− ions) later on. GABAA converts to an inhibitory receptor from an excitatory receptor by the upregulation of KCC2 cotransporter. This decreases the concentration of Cl− ion within cells. Therefore, the GAGAA subunits are involved in determining the nature of the receptor in response to GABA ligand. These changes suggest that editing of the subunit is important in the developing brain by regulating the Cl− permeability of the channel during development. The unedited receptor is activated faster and deactivates slower than the edited receptor.

See also 
 GABAA receptor

References

Further reading

External links 
 
 
 

Ion channels